Baldwin of Luxembourg (c. 1285 – 21 January 1354) was the Archbishop- Elector of Trier and Archchancellor of Burgundy from 1307 to his death. From 1328 to 1336, he was the diocesan administrator of the archdiocese of Mainz and from 1331 to 1337 (with interruptions) of those of Worms and Speyer. He was one of the most important German prelates of his age.

Born in Luxembourg to the count Henry VI, he was intended for an ecclesiastic career at an early age. He studied theology and canon law at the University of Paris, for his family was on good terms with the Capetian court of France. He was only twenty-two years of age when elected Archbishop of Trier in 1307. In 1308, he was consecrated bishop by Pope Clement V in Poitiers. He quickly became one of the most influential princes in Germany, influencing the election that year of his brother Henry VII as King and Holy Roman Emperor. From 1310 to 1313, Baldwin accompanied Henry in Italy, where he was crowned emperor in Rome on 29 June 1312.

In the election which followed Henry's early death the next year, Baldwin lent his support to Louis the Bavarian. He later repudiated the Bavarian, however, and moved to support his great-nephew Charles IV in 1346. He was Charles's greatest supporter in the west of the realm.

From 1324 to 1326, he was one of the four lords in the Four Lords' War against Metz. In 1328, he was lured into Starkenburg castle on the Moselle by Loretta of Sponheim. He was only released after a ransom was paid and concessions made. Likewise in that year, he was put forward by his own cathedral chapter as a candidate for the vacant Mainz archdiocese, but the Pope appointed Henry III of Virneburg. Baldwin did govern the archbishopric until the so-called "Mainz Schism" was terminated by the Avignon curia in 1336. During that time period, from 1331 to 1337, Baldwin had as well endeavoured to control the dioceses of Worms and Speyer.

Baldwin, like most medieval bishops, was a patron of his see. He built the Balduinbrücke (Baldwin's Bridge) in Koblenz and repaired the old Roman bridge in Trier. He reformed the administration of the archdiocese and preserved official documents. He had many copies made and four manuscript copies of the archives of the diocese survive in the main national archives in Koblenz. Baldwin also strove to connect the various regions of his diocese (Trier and Koblenz). He did not shy away from military methods.

He died in a monastic cell in the local Charterhouse and was buried in the west choir of Trier Cathedral.

See also
Codex Balduini Trevirensis

References

Archbishop-Electors of Trier
14th-century Roman Catholic archbishops in the Holy Roman Empire
House of Luxembourg
1280s births
1354 deaths
Year of birth uncertain
Medieval Luxembourgian nobility
14th-century Luxembourgian people